William Wayne Snavely (5 April 1920 – 14 May 2020) was a lieutenant general in the United States Air Force who served as Deputy Chief of Staff for systems and logistics of the United States Air Force from 1973 to 1975. Snavely died in 2020 at the age of 100.

References

1920 births
2020 deaths
United States Air Force generals
People from Los Angeles
American centenarians
Men centenarians
Military personnel from California